Francis Smythe may refer to:

 Frank Smythe (Francis Sydney Smythe, 1900–1949), English mountaineer, author, photographer and botanist
 Francis Smythe (priest) (1873–1966), Archdeacon of Lewes